Kay Ann Lenz (born March 4, 1953) is an American actress. She is the recipient of a Daytime Emmy Award and a Primetime Emmy Award, as well as nominations for a Golden Globe Award and a Saturn Award.

Lenz is best known for her title role in the film Breezy (1973), for which she was nominated for a Golden Globe Award for Most Promising Newcomer – Female. She is also known for her roles in the film House (1986), as well as the television series Midnight Caller (1988–1989) and Reasonable Doubts (1991–1993). For her role in the episode "After It Happened" of Midnight Caller, she won a Primetime Emmy Award for Outstanding Guest Actress in a Drama Series.

Early years
Lenz was born in Los Angeles, California to Ted Lenz, an actor and producer, and Kay Miller Lenz, who worked as a radio engineer and professional model. Her television debut was as a baby, held by a guest on a program that her father produced.

Career 
Lenz began working as a child actress, beginning with appearances in three episodes of This Is the Life when she was 14. She went on to appear in such television shows as The Andy Griffith Show (in the episode "Opie's Group" (1967) under the stage name Kay Ann Kemper) as well as in stage productions. She made a brief appearance billed as Kay Ann Kemper in American Graffiti (1973) as Jane, a girl at a dance. She achieved recognition for her title-role performance as the free spirit who captivates William Holden in Breezy, directed by Clint Eastwood.

Lenz made guest appearances in The Streets of San Francisco, Gunsmoke, MacGyver, McCloud, Cannon, and Petrocelli, and played a lead role in the film White Line Fever (1975) before being cast in 1976 in the miniseries Rich Man, Poor Man, for which she was nominated for an Emmy Award. She reprised her role for the sequel, Rich Man, Poor Man Book II (1977). Since the 1980s, she has played guest roles in numerous television series. She appeared in Albert Brooks' short film for a Season 1 episode of Saturday Night Live. 

In 1984, she appeared in Rod Stewart's music video for the song "Infatuation". She won a Primetime Emmy Award in 1989 for Midnight Caller. She was also nominated for two Primetime Emmy Awards for her role as flinty lawyer Maggie Zombro in the police/legal drama Reasonable Doubts.

Personal life
Lenz was the first wife of singer-actor David Cassidy. Of their marriage, Lenz says:I wasn’t used to that state-of-stardom lifestyle... When we eloped it was on the national news. All of a sudden I was getting mail from women telling me that they had three of his children.

The threats from Cassidy's fans became so frequent, Lenz retained the services of celebrity bodyguard Tommy Peacock. Lenz and Cassidy married on April 3, 1977, and divorced on December 28, 1983. She has no children.

Filmography

Film

Television

References

External links
 

Living people
American people of German descent
American child actresses
American film actresses
American television actresses
American voice actresses
Emmy Award winners
Actresses from Los Angeles
20th-century American actresses
21st-century American actresses
1953 births